Krzysztof Słaboń or Chris Slabon (born 21 February 1981) is a former speedway rider from Poland.

Speedway career
He rode in the top tier of British Speedway riding for the Ipswich Witches during the 2010 Elite League speedway season. He also held a Canadian licence and rode under the Canadian flag during the 1999 Individual Speedway Junior World Championship.

References 

1981 births
Living people
Polish speedway riders
Canadian speedway riders
Ipswich Witches riders